Anoka (YTB-810) was a United States Navy  named for Anoka, Minnesota.

Construction

The contract for Anoka was awarded 22 June 1970. She was laid down on 5 October 1970 at Sturgeon Bay, Wisconsin, by Peterson Builders and launched 15 April 1971.

Operational history

Anoka was assigned to the 5th Naval District and based at Norfolk, Virginia. She spent her entire Navy career operating as a harbor tug in the lower reaches of the Chesapeake Bay and the estuaries that feed the lower bay.

Stricken from the Navy List 13 March 2001, ex-Anoka was sold by the Defense Reutilization and Marketing Service (DRMS), 20 November 2001, to McAllister Towing, renamed Missy McAllister.

References

External links
 

 

Natick-class large harbor tugs
1971 ships
Ships built by Peterson Builders